Carlson Peak is one of the Bean Peaks in the Hauberg Mountains, Ellsworth Land, Antarctica. It was mapped by the United States Geological Survey from ground surveys and from U.S. Navy air photos, 1961–67, and named by the Advisory Committee on Antarctic Names for Paul R. Carlson, meteorologist at Byrd Station, summer 1965–66.

See also
 Mountains in Antarctica

References
 

Mountains of Ellsworth Land